The men's 500 metre at the 2012 World Short Track Speed Skating Championships took place on 10 March 2012, at the Shanghai Oriental Sports Center.

Results

Preliminaries
Top two athletes from each heat qualified for the heats.

Heat 1

Heat 3

Heat 5

Heat 7

Heat 9

Heat 11

Heat 13

Heat 2

Heat 4

Heat 6

Heat 8

Heat 10

Heat 12

Heat 14

Heats
Top two athletes from each heat and the two fastest thirds qualified for the quarterfinals.

Heat 1

Heat 3

Heat 5

Heat 7

Heat 2

Heat 4

Heat 6

Quarterfinals
Top two athletes from each heat qualified for the semifinals.

Heat 1

Heat 3

Heat 2

Heat 4

Semifinals
Top two athletes from each heat qualified for the final.

Heat 1

Heat 2

Final

References

2012 World Short Track Speed Skating Championships